The Šventoji (The Holy One) is the longest river that flows entirely within Lithuania and the largest tributary of the Neris. It originates from the Lake Samanis in the Gražutė Regional Park and flows into Neris near Jonava. The longest tributary of the Šventoji is the Širvinta.

The Šventoji passes through the cities of Anykščiai, Kavarskas and Ukmergė. In 1963–1964 a dam near Kavarskas was built to replenish the Nevėžis using water from the Šventoji. However, the dam is no longer used as it is too expensive, ineffective, and violates environmental regulations of the European Union. In 1959 the Antalieptė Reservoir, the second largest artificial lake in Lithuania, was built on the Šventoji.

Tributaries

The following rivers are tributaries to the river Šventoji (from source to mouth):

Left: Šavaša, Vyžuona, Aknysta, Taurožė, Beržuona, Elmė, Anykšta, Virinta, Dagia, Širvinta
Right: Kriauna, Nasvė, Jara, Pelyša, Vadaksta, Grieža, Latava, Biebė

References

Rivers of Lithuania